Spring Valley Academy (known locally as "SVA" or "Spring Valley") is a Seventh-day Adventist K-12 private school located in Centerville, Ohio. 
It is a part of the Seventh-day Adventist education system, the world's second largest Christian school system. Spring Valley Academy is chartered by the State of Ohio and is accredited by the North Central Association of Colleges and Schools and the Board of Regents of the General Conference of the Seventh-day Adventist Church. The school is currently operated by six Seventh-day Adventist churches in the Dayton metropolitan area.

Curriculum
The school’s curriculum consists primarily of the standard courses taught at college preparatory schools across the world. All students are required to take classes in the core areas of English, Basic Sciences, Mathematics, a Foreign Language, and Social Sciences. In addition, Bible classes are mandated on a yearly basis. In addition to its core curriculum, the school offers classes including Spanish III, Anatomy & Physiology, Physics, US History, Personal Finance, Psychology.

Academics
The required curriculum includes classes in the following subject areas: Religion, English, Oral Communications, Social Studies, Mathematics, Science, Physical Education, Health, Computer Applications, Fine Arts, and Electives.

Spiritual aspects
All students take Bible classes each year that they are enrolled. These classes cover topics in biblical history and Christian and denominational doctrines. Instructors in other disciplines also begin each class period with prayer or a short devotional thought, many which encourage student input. Weekly, the entire student body gathers together in the chapel for an hour-long chapel service. Outside the classrooms there is year-round spiritually oriented programming that relies on student involvement.

See also

 List of Seventh-day Adventist secondary schools
 Seventh-day Adventist education

References

Educational institutions established in 1968
High schools in Montgomery County, Ohio
Adventist secondary schools in the United States
Private high schools in Ohio
Private middle schools in Ohio
Private elementary schools in Ohio